Lia Bass is a Brazilian-born American rabbi and the first Latin American female rabbi in the world. She is also Northern Virginia's first female Conservative
rabbi and the first woman from Brazil to be ordained as a rabbi. She was born in Rio de Janeiro, and was ordained by the Jewish Theological Seminary in New York in 1994. In 2001 she became the rabbi of Congregation Etz Hayim in Arlington, Virginia. and served until 2020. In 2020 she founded and, as of Sept. 2022, runs the Jewish Institute for Lifelong Learning & Innovation, based in Arlington, Virginia.

References

American Conservative rabbis
Brazilian Conservative Jews
Brazilian expatriates in the United States
Brazilian rabbis
Jewish Theological Seminary of America alumni
People from Rio de Janeiro (city)
Conservative women rabbis
Living people
Year of birth missing (living people)
21st-century American Jews